Legacy High School is a high school in North Las Vegas, Nevada that opened in 2006.  It is part of the Clark County School District,  The school opened with an enrollment of 1,820 and currently has an enrollment of 2,980.  Legacy High School describes itself as a Global Studies school, offering eight different sections of foreign language (French, German, Italian, Japanese, Mandarin, Russian, Sign language and Spanish).  When the school opened during the 2006-07 school year, Legacy offered Arabic as one of its world languages courses, the first high school in Nevada to do so.  The program has since been discontinued.

Extracurricular activities

Athletics 
The athletic program that represents Legacy is known as the Longhorns and compete in the Southwest Division of the Sunset 4A Region.  Much of the schools athletic logos and uniforms are based on those used by athletic department at the University of Texas, Austin. Legacy High School's biggest rivalry is with Arbor View High School. Their most prized possession is "The Horns" trophy. This rivalry game is also known as "The Battle of the Bulls" created by the class of 2008 student council. The rivalry between the high schools are 5-4 Arbor leads.

The 2009 Legacy football team won the school's first division championship, finishing the season 11-0 and 8-0 in the Northwest Division.  The wins included a 7–6 victory over perennial powerhouse Palo Verde.  Legacy would lose in the Sunset 4A Region semifinals to Cimarron-Memorial, 21–20.

The Men's Volleyball team took a major turn in the 2012-2013 school year. From previous years the Longhorns had a combine record of (13-32). To start off the new season Legacy brought in a new coach from Arbor View High School. The new coach had led the Longhorns into their first playoff appearance in school history. Unfortunately the Longhorns were eliminated from the Nevada 4A State tournament in the second round. Ending the season with a record of (18-6).

Sunset 4A Region - Northwest Division Championships
 Football - 2009
 Baseball - 2010
 Softball - 2010
 Men's Soccer - 2010, 2011, 2012, 2015
 Flag Football - 2014, 2015
 Men's Volleyball - 2014, 2015

Sunset 4A Region - Sunset Region Championships
 Men's Soccer - 2010, 2011
 Men's Volleyball - 2014, 2015

Sunset 4A Region - State Championships
 Men's Soccer- 2010, 2011
 Men's Volleyball- 2014

References

External links 
 
 

Buildings and structures in North Las Vegas, Nevada
Educational institutions established in 2006
High schools in Clark County, Nevada
School buildings completed in 2006
Public high schools in Nevada
2006 establishments in Nevada